ViolaWWW is a discontinued browser, the first to support scripting and stylesheets for the World Wide Web (WWW). It was first released in 1991/1992 for Unix and acted as the recommended browser at CERN, where the WWW was invented, but eventually lost its position as most frequently used browser to Mosaic.

Viola
Released in 1992, Viola was the invention of Pei-Yuan Wei, a member of the Experimental Computing Facility (XCF) at the University of California, Berkeley. Viola was a UNIX-based programming/scripting language; the acronym stood for "Visually Interactive Object-oriented Language and Application".

Pei's interest in graphically based software began with HyperCard, which he first encountered in 1989. Of that, Pei said, "HyperCard was very compelling back then, you know graphically, this hyperlink thing, it was just not very global and it only worked on Mac... and I didn't even have a Mac". Only having access to X terminals, Pei, in 1990, created the first version of Viola for such terminals: "I got a HyperCard manual and looked at it and just basically took the concepts and implemented them..."

Pei released Viola 0.8 in 1991.

History of ViolaWWW 

After graduating, Pei developed Viola further while working with the XCF and startups. Later, he would be funded by O'Reilly Books, the technical publisher, which used the software to help demonstrate its Global Network Navigator site. His major goal was to create a version of Viola for the Internet:

Released in 1992, ViolaWWW was the first browser to add extended functionality such as embedded scriptable objects, stylesheets, and tables. Early versions were received well at CERN. Ed Krol also highlighted the browser in his popular 1992 text, Whole Internet User's Guide and Catalog.

As ViolaWWW developed, it began to look more like HyperCard:

ViolaWWW was based on the Viola toolkit, which is a tool for the development and support of visual interactive media applications, with a multimedia web browser being a possible application. Viola ran under the X Window System and could be used to build complex hypermedia applications with features like applets and other interactive content as early as 1992.

Firsts
Viola was the first web browser to have the following features:

 client-side document insertion, predating frames, or syndication via JavaScript output writing, which are used commonly today.

 a simple stylesheet mechanism used for inserting style information such as fonts, color and alignments into a document. This was implemented in Viola well before CSS was developed in 1998:

 a sidebar panel used for displaying "meta" information, intra document navigational links, and other information, similar to (but not as sophisticated as) features found in several modern browsers.
 a scripting language that can be accessed from an HTML document, such that an HTML document can embed highly interactive scripts/applets.  This can be seen as the precursor to JavaScript and embedded objects.

 Forms

Competing against Mosaic
While ViolaWWW opened the door to the World Wide Web, its limitations, including it only being implemented on the X Window System, meant it could not compete with Mosaic, the browser which brought the Web into the mainstream. Among other things, Mosaic was easier to install on the computers most people were using. Originally developed for UNIX, it was soon ported to Microsoft Windows, a platform on which ViolaWWW never ran.

ViolaWWW in patent lawsuits

In 1999, Eolas Technologies and the University of California filed suit in the US District Court for the Northern District of Illinois against Microsoft, claiming infringement of U.S. patent 5,838,906, (covering browser plugins) by the Internet Explorer web browser. Eolas won the initial case in August 2003 and was awarded damages of $ from Microsoft. The District Court reaffirmed the jury's decision in January 2004.

In March 2005, an appeals court directed that there be a retrial, overturning a decision that Microsoft pay $521 million in damages. The appeals court said that the initial ruling had ignored two key arguments put forward by Microsoft. Microsoft had wanted to show the court that ViolaWWW was prior art, since it was created in 1993 at the University of California, a year before the key patent were filed. Microsoft had also suggested that Michael David Doyle, Eolas' founder and a former University of California researcher, had intentionally concealed his knowledge of ViolaWWW when filing the patent claim. Microsoft subsequently settled with Eolas, in August 2007, without a retrial. Eolas continued to file suits against dozens of other technology companies.

In February 2012 a Texas jury found that two of Eolas' patents were invalid after testimony from several defendants including Tim Berners-Lee and Pei-Yuan Wei, credited as creator of the Viola browser. The testimony professed that the Viola browser included Eolas' claimed inventions before the filing date (September 7, 1993). There is "substantial evidence that Viola was publicly known and used" before the plaintiffs' alleged conception date, it added. The ruling effectively ended a pending lawsuit against 22 companies including Yahoo, Google, and many online retailers.

See also 

 History of the World Wide Web
 History of the web browser

References

External links
 
 
 
 Download Viola

POSIX web browsers
1991 software
1992 software
Discontinued web browsers